Abdulaziz Al-Subyani (born April 12, 1989) is a Saudi Arabian footballer playing for Al-Ittihad club. He plays as a forward or winger. He is known for his speedily attack playing-style.

References

1989 births
Living people
Saudi Arabian footballers
Ittihad FC players
Al-Qadsiah FC players
Al-Raed FC players
Al-Hazem F.C. players
Al-Najma SC players
Association football forwards
Saudi First Division League players
Saudi Professional League players
Saudi Second Division players